Sonauli is a town, near city of Maharajganj in Maharajganj district in Uttar Pradesh, India. It located on the Indo-Nepal Border and is a well-known and most famous transit point between India and Nepal.

Sonauli is around  75  km from district headquarter Mahrajganj, Uttar Pradesh. 90 km from Gorakhpur, which is the nearest major city. The nearest Railway station from Sonauli is Nautanwa Railway Station, which is around 7 km away and is now well connected with Indian Railway Network. Earlier Nautanwa was connected with Gorakhpur through Meter Gauge Railway Track. But with the development of Indian Railway Network, this track is converted into Broad gauge which facilitate fast long railway transit.

Sonauli India–Nepal Border Crossing

The Sonauli India–Nepal border crossing or Sonauli Integrated Check Post in Uttar Pradesh is the most popular and designated Integrated Check Posts (ICP), with both customs and immigration facilities:

Places of interest
Though Sonauli itself is not known for any specific tourism destination, it is very close to well known Buddhist tourist spot,  - Lumbini i.e. Birthplace of Lord Gautam Buddha which is located in Nepal.

Bhairahawa in Nepal has the nearest airport which is 4 kilometers from the Sonauli border.  This is currently a domestic airport only however an international terminal and runway is under construction and due to open late 2019. Gorakhpur Airport is the nearest airport in India which is about 83 Km from the Border and is the largest airport nearby of bearing strength of 377 peoples which serves both as a  Civil and for Fighter Jets.

Farendi tiwari bazar, 2 km west, a site for healthy bilateral trade between locals of both india and nepal.
Opens on Wednesday and Saturday.
You can overglance not only with the economic exchange but also cultural exchange at this place.
This market organized by farendi tiwari landlords and under supervision of SSB (Sashastra Seema Bal).
A small check dam near this market place to control the water catchment from Himalayas through Nepal is used for irrigation purposes by farmers.

References

Cities and towns in Maharajganj district
Points for exit and entry of nationals from third countries along the India–Nepal border